Mayago is the main character in the Korean indigenous legend about the goddess of Mount Jiri (Jirisan). Her status is as a mountain goddess, who is in charge of taking care of a particular mountain to which she is assigned to. Mountain god(dess)s are one of the main deity a Mudang or a priest(ess) who prayed to for good luck and harvests. Sometimes such priest(ess)s lived on the mountain, usually the higher the better as the height of the mountain determines how close one is to heaven and the gods who reside there.

The Legend

Banya was the god whom the Mt. Jiri’s patron goddess Mayago dearly loved. Mayago would spend day after day happily weaving a magnificent regalia for Banya using threads of silk she conjured from tree barks. She anxiously waited for her lover so she can give her gift to him. 

Every time the wind blew over the Jiri mountain, Mayago saw Banya coming through the Ironstar flower fields to meet her. Her hair flying she ran out to meet him in the sea of flowers, but her lover was nowhere to be seen. 

She realized the sight of “Banya” coming was merely the work of her imagination, caused by the movements of the flowers. Disappointed and full of anger she burst out in tears, and cursing the Ironstar flowers who deceived and they never blossomed again. Not ceasing her vengeance, she then ripped Banya’s clothes to a million shreds and threw them into the woods. The pond on top of the mountain which she used to see her face every morning  dried up. 

This pond later became the Sanhi(山姬) Pond (Pond of the Mountain Dryad) of the ChonHwang Peak (Peak of the Empyreal Emperor) of Jarngtuh Block (Market Block. The “Market” is a proper noun.). Banya’s clothes which he never received were seen shredded, hanging in the branches of the mountain woods, becoming the parasitic PoongLan (Wind Orchid). Because all this happened from a false memory, the particular PoongLan(風蘭) that are indigenous to Mt. Jiri are also HwanLan(幻蘭), or Mirage Flowers.

Korean legends